Walter Leslie Smallhorn (5 July 1881 – 23 November 1968) was an Australian rules footballer who played with South Melbourne in the Victorian Football League (VFL).

Notes

External links 

1881 births
1968 deaths
Australian rules footballers from Hobart
Sydney Swans players
Lefroy Football Club players